Miquette is a 1940 French comedy film directed by Jean Boyer and starring Lilian Harvey, Lucien Baroux and André Lefaur. It was one of two films made in France by the Anglo-German star Harvey, after emigrating from Nazi Germany. It was her final film appearance, although she continued to act on stage.

The film is based on the play Miquette et sa mère by Robert de Flers and Gaston Arman de Caillavet, which was later adapted into the 1950 film Miquette.

Cast
 Lilian Harvey as Miquette Grandier
 Lucien Baroux as Monchablon
 André Lefaur as Le marquis de la Tour-Mirande
 Daniel Clérice as Urbain de la Tour-Mirande
 Marguerite Pierry as Madame Grandier
 Léon Belières as Lahirel
 Suzanne Dantès as Mademoiselle Émilienne
 Agnès Capri as Madame Mercadier
 Madeleine Suffel as Perrine
 Daniel Gélin
 Eliane Charles
 Jean Brochard
 Hugues de Bagratide
 Yvonne Yma
 Madeleine Suffel as Perrine
 Anthony Gildès

References

Bibliography

External links 
 

1940 films
French comedy films
French black-and-white films
1940 comedy films
1940s French-language films
Films directed by Jean Boyer
French films based on plays
Remakes of French films
1940s French films